Greatest Hits Live is the third live album by the band Saxon. It was released in 1990 just one year after their previous live album Rock 'n' Roll Gypsies to celebrate the tenth anniversary years of the band's activity, together with a VHS of the concert. This '10 Years Of Denim And Leather' concert was later released on DVD as Saxon 'Live Legends' with the extra track Strong Arm of the Law.

Track listing

All songs written by Saxon except where noted

Personnel
 Biff Byford - vocals
 Paul Quinn - guitar
 Graham Oliver - guitar
 Tim "Nibbs" Carter - bass guitar
 Nigel Glockler - drums

 Production
 Biff Byford - producer
 Ian Taylor - audio engineer
 East Midlands Television Centre, Nottingham  - recording location
 OUTSIDE Studio, Manor - mixing location

References

Saxon (band) live albums
1990 live albums
Saxon (band) video albums